The 1968 US Open (formerly known as U.S. National Championships) was a tennis tournament that took place on the outdoor grass courts at the West Side Tennis Club, Forest Hills in New York City, United States. The tournament ran from 29 August until 8 September. It was the 88th staging of the tournament and the fourth Grand Slam event of 1968. It was the first edition of the tournament in the Open Era of tennis and as such for the first time offered prize money, totaling  $100,000. Arthur Ashe and Virginia Wade won the singles titles. Ashe was still registered as an amateur and therefore not entitled to the  $14,000 first-prize money, which instead went to runner-up Tom Okker, while Wade earned $6,000. Frank Parker, at the age of 52, lost to eventual champion Arthur Ashe in the second round, and still holds the record for the oldest man to compete in a Grand Slam singles tournament.

Finals

Men's singles

 Arthur Ashe defeated  Tom Okker, 14–12, 5–7, 6–3, 3–6, 6–3
• It was Ashe's 1st career Grand Slam singles title and his 1st and only at the US Open.

Women's singles

 Virginia Wade defeated  Billie Jean King, 6–4, 6–2

• It was Wade's 1st career Grand Slam singles title and her 1st and only at the US Open.

Men's doubles

 Bob Lutz /  Stan Smith defeated  Arthur Ashe /  Andrés Gimeno, 11–9, 6–1, 7–5
• It was Lutz's 1st career Grand Slam doubles title.
• It was Smith's 1st career Grand Slam doubles title.

Women's doubles

 Maria Bueno /  Margaret Court defeated  Rosemary Casals /  Billie Jean King, 4–6, 9–7, 8–6
• It was Bueno's 11th and last career Grand Slam doubles title and her 4th at the US Open.
• It was Court's 10th career Grand Slam doubles title and her 2nd at the US Open.

Mixed doubles
No mixed doubles event was held at the 1968 US Open. Results often listed are those of the 1968 U.S. National Championships held a month earlier in Boston.
 Mary-Ann Eisel /  Peter Curtis defeated  Tory Fretz /  Gerry Perry 6–4, 7–5

References

External links
Official website of US Open

 
 

 
US Open
US Open (tennis) by year
US Open (tennis)
US Open (tennis)
US Open (tennis)
US Open (tennis)